The 1925 Pittsburgh Pirates finished first in the National League with a record of 95–58. They defeated the Washington Senators four games to three to win their second World Series championship.

The Pirates had three future Hall of Famers in their starting lineup: Max Carey, Kiki Cuyler, and Pie Traynor.

Pittsburgh defeated the Brooklyn Robins, 21–5, on June 20 and two days later won 24–6 against the St. Louis Cardinals, becoming the first team since 1901 to score 20 or more runs in consecutive games. This feat was later matched by the 1950 Boston Red Sox.

Regular season 
 May 7, 1925: Glenn Wright of the Pirates executed an unassisted triple play. He caught a line drive, touched second base and tagged the runner going back to first base.

Season standings

Record vs. opponents

Game log

|- bgcolor="ffbbbb"
| 1 || April 14 || @ Cubs || 2–8 || Alexander || Yde (0–1) || — || 38,000 || 0–1
|- bgcolor="ccffcc"
| 2 || April 15 || @ Cubs || 8–4 || Meadows (1–0) || Cooper || Morrison (1) || 6,500 || 1–1
|- bgcolor="ffbbbb"
| 3 || April 16 || @ Cubs || 3–8 || Blake || Kremer (0–1) || — || 7,000 || 1–2
|- bgcolor="ffbbbb"
| 4 || April 17 || @ Cubs || 6–9 || Kaufmann || Morrison (0–1) || — || — || 1–3
|- bgcolor="ffbbbb"
| 5 || April 18 || @ Reds || 2–12 || Donohue || Adams (0–1) || — || 8,500 || 1–4
|- bgcolor="ffbbbb"
| 6 || April 19 || @ Reds || 2–6 || Luque || Yde (0–2) || — || 25,000 || 1–5
|- bgcolor="ccffcc"
| 7 || April 20 || @ Reds || 4–2 || Meadows (2–0) || Rixey || — || — || 2–5
|- bgcolor="ccffcc"
| 8 || April 22 || Cubs || 6–1 || Morrison (1–1) || Kaufmann || — || 31,000 || 3–5
|- bgcolor="ffbbbb"
| 9 || April 23 || Cubs || 9–10 || Jacobs || Songer (0–1) || Blake || 7,000 || 3–6
|- bgcolor="ffbbbb"
| 10 || April 24 || Cubs || 2–7 || Alexander || Yde (0–3) || — || 6,000 || 3–7
|- bgcolor="ffbbbb"
| 11 || April 25 || Cubs || 3–4 || Blake || Meadows (2–1) || — || 20,000 || 3–8
|- bgcolor="ccffcc"
| 12 || April 26 || @ Cardinals || 6–1 || Adams (1–1) || Haines || — || 10,000 || 4–8
|- bgcolor="ccffcc"
| 13 || April 28 || @ Cardinals || 7–3 || Morrison (2–1) || Rhem || — || 2,000 || 5–8
|-

|- bgcolor="ccffcc"
| 14 || May 2 || Reds || 18–3 || Meadows (3–1) || Donohue || — || 19,000 || 6–8
|- bgcolor="ffbbbb"
| 15 || May 3 || @ Reds || 4–5 || Luque || Morrison (2–2) || Donohue || — || 6–9
|- bgcolor="ffbbbb"
| 16 || May 7 || Cardinals || 9–10 || Hallahan || Adams (1–2) || Rhem || 2,000 || 6–10
|- bgcolor="ffbbbb"
| 17 || May 8 || @ Phillies || 7–15 || Carlson || Meadows (3–2) || — || — || 6–11
|- bgcolor="ccffcc"
| 18 || May 9 || @ Phillies || 6–5 || Morrison (3–2) || Mitchell || Meadows (1) || — || 7–11
|- bgcolor="ffbbbb"
| 19 || May 12 || @ Phillies || 5–8 || Ring || Aldridge (0–1) || — || — || 7–12
|- bgcolor="ccffcc"
| 20 || May 12 || @ Phillies || 13–8 || Meadows (4–2) || Couch || Adams (1) || — || 8–12
|- bgcolor="ccffcc"
| 21 || May 13 || @ Braves || 5–4 || Kremer (1–1) || Genewich || — || 5,500 || 9–12
|- bgcolor="ccffcc"
| 22 || May 14 || @ Braves || 7–1 || Morrison (4–2) || Barnes || — || 4,000 || 10–12
|- bgcolor="ccffcc"
| 23 || May 16 || @ Braves || 7–5 (10) || Yde (1–3) || Ryan || — || — || 11–12
|- bgcolor="ccffcc"
| 24 || May 17 || @ Robins || 8–5 || Meadows (5–2) || Vance || — || 27,000 || 12–12
|- bgcolor="ffbbbb"
| 25 || May 18 || @ Robins || 7–12 || Grimes || Aldridge (0–2) || — || 5,000 || 12–13
|- bgcolor="ffbbbb"
| 26 || May 19 || @ Robins || 5–9 || Ehrhardt || Morrison (4–3) || — || 12,000 || 12–14
|- bgcolor="ccffcc"
| 27 || May 20 || @ Robins || 12–3 || Kremer (2–1) || Petty || — || 5,000 || 13–14
|- bgcolor="ffbbbb"
| 28 || May 21 || @ Giants || 4–5 || Scott || Morrison (4–4) || — || 6,000 || 13–15
|- bgcolor="ccffcc"
| 29 || May 22 || @ Giants || 6–5 (10) || Aldridge (1–2) || Dean || — || 4,000 || 14–15
|- bgcolor="ffbbbb"
| 30 || May 23 || @ Giants || 1–10 || Greenfield || Yde (1–4) || — || 30,000 || 14–16
|- bgcolor="ccffcc"
| 31 || May 25 || Cubs || 5–3 || Morrison (5–4) || Bush || — || 2,000 || 15–16
|- bgcolor="ccffcc"
| 32 || May 26 || Cubs || 7–2 || Kremer (3–1) || Jones || — || 6,000 || 16–16
|- bgcolor="ccffcc"
| 33 || May 27 || Cubs || 13–3 || Aldridge (2–2) || Blake || — || — || 17–16
|- bgcolor="ccffcc"
| 34 || May 28 || Cardinals || 7–4 || Meadows (6–2) || Haines || — || 3,000 || 18–16
|- bgcolor="ccffcc"
| 35 || May 29 || Cardinals || 6–5 || Kremer (4–1) || Dickerman || — || 5,000 || 19–16
|- bgcolor="ccffcc"
| 36 || May 30 || Cardinals || 4–1 || Yde (2–4) || Sothoron || — || 18,000 || 20–16
|- bgcolor="ccffcc"
| 37 || May 30 || Cardinals || 15–5 || Morrison (6–4) || Day || — || 28,000 || 21–16
|- bgcolor="ffbbbb"
| 38 || May 31 || @ Cubs || 2–11 || Blake || Kremer (4–2) || — || 18,000 || 21–17
|-

|- bgcolor="ffbbbb"
| 39 || June 1 || @ Cubs || 5–6 || Bush || Aldridge (2–3) || Kaufmann || 5,000 || 21–18
|- bgcolor="ccffcc"
| 40 || June 4 || Phillies || 16–3 || Meadows (7–2) || Knight || — || — || 22–18
|- bgcolor="ffbbbb"
| 41 || June 5 || Phillies || 5–6 (11) || Mitchell || Kremer (4–3) || — || — || 22–19
|- bgcolor="ccffcc"
| 42 || June 6 || Phillies || 9–3 || Yde (3–4) || Carlson || — || — || 23–19
|- bgcolor="ccffcc"
| 43 || June 8 || Braves || 8–4 || Aldridge (3–3) || Marquard || — || 3,000 || 24–19
|- bgcolor="ffbbbb"
| 44 || June 9 || Braves || 4–7 (11) || Barnes || Meadows (7–3) || — || — || 24–20
|- bgcolor="ffbbbb"
| 45 || June 10 || Braves || 4–6 || Graham || Morrison (6–5) || — || — || 24–21
|- bgcolor="ccffcc"
| 46 || June 11 || Braves || 11–3 || Yde (4–4) || Ryan || — || — || 25–21
|- bgcolor="ccffcc"
| 47 || June 12 || Giants || 6–2 || Aldridge (4–3) || Barnes || — || 16,000 || 26–21
|- bgcolor="ccffcc"
| 48 || June 13 || Giants || 6–4 || Meadows (8–3) || McQuillan || — || 28,000 || 27–21
|- bgcolor="ccffcc"
| 49 || June 15 || Giants || 7–6 || Adams (2–2) || Scott || — || 18,000 || 28–21
|- bgcolor="ccffcc"
| 50 || June 16 || Giants || 13–11 (10) || Meadows (9–3) || Nehf || — || 21,000 || 29–21
|- bgcolor="ccffcc"
| 51 || June 17 || Robins || 8–3 || Yde (5–4) || Grimes || — || — || 30–21
|- bgcolor="ffbbbb"
| 52 || June 18 || Robins || 2–6 || Vance || Kremer (4–4) || — || — || 30–22
|- bgcolor="ccffcc"
| 53 || June 19 || Robins || 9–6 || Meadows (10–3) || Ehrhardt || — || 6,000 || 31–22
|- bgcolor="ccffcc"
| 54 || June 20 || Robins || 21–5 || Adams (3–2) || Petty || — || 20,000 || 32–22
|- bgcolor="ccffcc"
| 55 || June 22 || @ Cardinals || 24–6 || Kremer (5–4) || Rhem || — || 4,500 || 33–22
|- bgcolor="ffbbbb"
| 56 || June 24 || @ Cardinals || 3–11 || Haines || Yde (5–5) || — || 8,000 || 33–23
|- bgcolor="ccffcc"
| 57 || June 24 || @ Cardinals || 7–6 || Morrison (7–5) || Sherdel || Adams (2) || 12,000 || 34–23
|- bgcolor="ccffcc"
| 58 || June 25 || @ Cardinals || 4–3 || Meadows (11–3) || Dickerman || — || 3,500 || 35–23
|- bgcolor="ccffcc"
| 59 || June 26 || Reds || 5–3 || Kremer (6–4) || May || — || — || 36–23
|- bgcolor="ccffcc"
| 60 || June 27 || Reds || 3–2 || Adams (4–2) || Luque || — || 36,000 || 37–23
|- bgcolor="ffbbbb"
| 61 || June 27 || Reds || 2–6 || Donohue || Aldridge (4–4) || — || 35,353 || 37–24
|- bgcolor="ccffcc"
| 62 || June 28 || @ Reds || 5–2 || Yde (6–5) || Benton || — || 35,353 || 38–24
|- bgcolor="ccffcc"
| 63 || June 29 || @ Reds || 8–1 || Morrison (8–5) || Rixey || — || 1,800 || 39–24
|- bgcolor="ffbbbb"
| 64 || June 30 || @ Cubs || 0–1 || Kaufmann || Meadows (11–4) || — || 5,000 || 39–25
|-

|- bgcolor="ccffcc"
| 65 || July 1 || @ Cubs || 8–6 || Kremer (7–4) || Alexander || — || 3,000 || 40–25
|- bgcolor="ccffcc"
| 66 || July 2 || Reds || 2–1 || Sheehan (1–0) || Luque || — || — || 41–25
|- bgcolor="ffbbbb"
| 67 || July 3 || Reds || 0–8 || Donohue || Adams (4–3) || — || — || 41–26
|- bgcolor="ccffcc"
| 68 || July 4 || Reds || 7–5 || Yde (7–5) || Biemiller || — || 22,000 || 42–26
|- bgcolor="ccffcc"
| 69 || July 4 || Reds || 7–1 || Meadows (12–4) || Rixey || — || 25,000 || 43–26
|- bgcolor="ccffcc"
| 70 || July 5 || @ Cubs || 3–2 || Kremer (8–4) || Bush || Morrison (2) || 25,000 || 44–26
|- bgcolor="ffbbbb"
| 71 || July 7 || @ Giants || 6–7 || Greenfield || Sheehan (1–1) || Nehf || 8,000 || 44–27
|- bgcolor="ccffcc"
| 72 || July 9 || @ Giants || 12–3 || Yde (8–5) || Scott || — || — || 45–27
|- bgcolor="ffbbbb"
| 73 || July 9 || @ Giants || 5–7 || Dean || Morrison (8–6) || — || 40,000 || 45–28
|- bgcolor="ccffcc"
| 74 || July 11 || @ Robins || 7–6 || Meadows (13–4) || Grimes || — || 15,000 || 46–28
|- bgcolor="ffbbbb"
| 75 || July 12 || @ Robins || 3–4 || Osborne || Kremer (8–5) || — || 15,000 || 46–29
|- bgcolor="ccffcc"
| 76 || July 13 || @ Robins || 4–2 || Aldridge (5–4) || Hubbell || — || — || 47–29
|- bgcolor="ccffcc"
| 77 || July 14 || @ Robins || 8–5 || Yde (9–5) || Vance || — || — || 48–29
|- bgcolor="ffbbbb"
| 78 || July 15 || @ Braves || 3–4 || Benton || Morrison (8–7) || — || 4,000 || 48–30
|- bgcolor="ffbbbb"
| 79 || July 16 || @ Braves || 8–9 (10) || Genewich || Kremer (8–6) || — || 3,500 || 48–31
|- bgcolor="ccffcc"
| 80 || July 17 || @ Braves || 7–3 (10) || Adams (5–3) || Graham || — || 3,500 || 49–31
|- bgcolor="ccffcc"
| 81 || July 18 || @ Braves || 9–8 || Yde (10–5) || Cooney || Kremer (1) || — || 50–31
|- bgcolor="ffbbbb"
| 82 || July 18 || @ Braves || 1–2 (11) || Smith || Morrison (8–8) || — || — || 50–32
|- bgcolor="ffbbbb"
| 83 || July 20 || @ Phillies || 3–6 || Ring || Meadows (13–5) || — || — || 50–33
|- bgcolor="ffbbbb"
| 84 || July 21 || @ Phillies || 2–4 || Mitchell || Kremer (8–7) || — || 1,000 || 50–34
|- bgcolor="ccffcc"
| 85 || July 23 || Cardinals || 3–2 || Yde (11–5) || Haines || — || 7,000 || 51–34
|- bgcolor="ccffcc"
| 86 || July 24 || Cardinals || 5–3 || Morrison (9–8) || Rhem || — || 8,000 || 52–34
|- bgcolor="ffbbbb"
| 87 || July 25 || Cardinals || 2–7 || Mails || Adams (5–4) || — || 11,000 || 52–35
|- bgcolor="ccffcc"
| 88 || July 26 || @ Cubs || 6–4 || Aldridge (6–4) || Kaufmann || — || 22,000 || 53–35
|- bgcolor="ccffcc"
| 89 || July 27 || Braves || 6–5 (10) || Morrison (10–8) || Barnes || — || 5,000 || 54–35
|- bgcolor="ccffcc"
| 90 || July 28 || Braves || 5–1 || Meadows (14–5) || Benton || — || — || 55–35
|- bgcolor="ccffcc"
| 91 || July 29 || Braves || 8–6 || Yde (12–5) || Cooney || Morrison (3) || — || 56–35
|- bgcolor="ffbbbb"
| 92 || July 30 || Braves || 1–5 || Genewich || Aldridge (6–5) || — || — || 56–36
|-

|- bgcolor="ffbbbb"
| 93 || August 1 || Phillies || 2–3 || Decatur || Morrison (10–9) || — || — || 56–37
|- bgcolor="ffbbbb"
| 94 || August 1 || Phillies || 2–4 || Ring || Meadows (14–6) || — || 25,000 || 56–38
|- bgcolor="ccffcc"
| 95 || August 3 || Phillies || 3–2 || Yde (13–5) || Carlson || Adams (3) || — || 57–38
|- bgcolor="ccffcc"
| 96 || August 3 || Phillies || 3–2 (11) || Aldridge (7–5) || Couch || — || — || 58–38
|- bgcolor="ffbbbb"
| 97 || August 4 || Phillies || 4–8 || Mitchell || Morrison (10–10) || — || — || 58–39
|- bgcolor="ccffcc"
| 98 || August 6 || Robins || 5–1 || Kremer (9–7) || Vance || — || 11,000 || 59–39
|- bgcolor="ccffcc"
| 99 || August 7 || Robins || 10–9 || Morrison (11–10) || Ehrhardt || — || 7,000 || 60–39
|- bgcolor="ccffcc"
| 100 || August 8 || Robins || 12–8 || Morrison (12–10) || Oeschger || — || — || 61–39
|- bgcolor="ccffcc"
| 101 || August 8 || Robins || 5–4 || Adams (6–4) || Ehrhardt || — || 35,000 || 62–39
|- bgcolor="ffbbbb"
| 102 || August 10 || Giants || 1–2 || Scott || Meadows (14–7) || — || 20,000 || 62–40
|- bgcolor="ccffcc"
| 103 || August 11 || Giants || 7–4 || Morrison (13–10) || Dean || — || 22,000 || 63–40
|- bgcolor="ccffcc"
| 104 || August 12 || Giants || 5–3 || Yde (14–5) || Barnes || — || 22,000 || 64–40
|- bgcolor="ffbbbb"
| 105 || August 13 || Giants || 1–4 || Greenfield || Aldridge (7–6) || — || 24,000 || 64–41
|- bgcolor="ccffcc"
| 106 || August 14 || Reds || 14–6 || Meadows (15–7) || Luque || — || 6,500 || 65–41
|- bgcolor="ffbbbb"
| 107 || August 15 || Reds || 1–8 || Donohue || Kremer (9–8) || — || 20,000 || 65–42
|- bgcolor="ffbbbb"
| 108 || August 16 || @ Reds || 1–6 || Rixey || Morrison (13–11) || — || 15,000 || 65–43
|- bgcolor="ccffcc"
| 109 || August 18 || @ Robins || 11–4 || Aldridge (8–6) || Osborne || — || — || 66–43
|- bgcolor="ffbbbb"
| 110 || August 19 || @ Robins || 7–8 || Vance || Meadows (15–8) || — || 5,000 || 66–44
|- bgcolor="ccffcc"
| 111 || August 20 || @ Robins || 2–1 || Kremer (10–8) || Grimes || — || 5,000 || 67–44
|- bgcolor="ccffcc"
| 112 || August 22 || @ Giants || 8–1 || Meadows (16–8) || Barnes || — || 51,200 || 68–44
|- bgcolor="ccffcc"
| 113 || August 22 || @ Giants || 2–1 || Aldridge (9–6) || Scott || — || 55,000 || 69–44
|- bgcolor="ffbbbb"
| 114 || August 23 || @ Giants || 4–7 || Greenfield || Adams (6–5) || Scott || — || 69–45
|- bgcolor="ccffcc"
| 115 || August 23 || @ Giants || 3–2 || Morrison (14–11) || Fitzsimmons || Oldham (1) || 53,000 || 70–45
|- bgcolor="ccffcc"
| 116 || August 24 || @ Giants || 9–2 || Kremer (11–8) || Dean || — || 25,000 || 71–45
|- bgcolor="ffbbbb"
| 117 || August 25 || @ Braves || 1–2 || Barnes || Yde (14–6) || — || 10,000 || 71–46
|- bgcolor="ccffcc"
| 118 || August 26 || @ Braves || 2–0 || Meadows (17–8) || Smith || — || — || 72–46
|- bgcolor="ccffcc"
| 119 || August 27 || @ Braves || 1–0 || Aldridge (10–6) || Benton || — || — || 73–46
|- bgcolor="ccffcc"
| 120 || August 28 || @ Phillies || 10–9 || Oldham (1–0) || Ring || Kremer (2) || 5,000 || 74–46
|- bgcolor="ccffcc"
| 121 || August 29 || @ Phillies || 11–2 || Yde (15–6) || Decatur || — || — || 75–46
|- bgcolor="ccffcc"
| 122 || August 29 || @ Phillies || 13–1 || Kremer (12–8) || Couch || — || 18,000 || 76–46
|- bgcolor="ccffcc"
| 123 || August 31 || @ Phillies || 10–3 || Meadows (18–8) || Knight || — || 5,000 || 77–46
|-

|- bgcolor="ccffcc"
| 124 || September 1 || @ Phillies || 10–3 || Aldridge (11–6) || Carlson || — || 2,000 || 78–46
|- bgcolor="ccffcc"
| 125 || September 2 || Reds || 8–2 || Morrison (15–11) || Donohue || — || 8,000 || 79–46
|- bgcolor="ccffcc"
| 126 || September 3 || Cardinals || 5–2 || Kremer (13–8) || Sherdel || — || — || 80–46
|- bgcolor="ffbbbb"
| 127 || September 4 || Cardinals || 3–9 || Reinhart || Yde (15–7) || — || — || 80–47
|- bgcolor="ccffcc"
| 128 || September 5 || Cardinals || 6–5 || Morrison (16–11) || Dyer || — || — || 81–47
|- bgcolor="ccffcc"
| 129 || September 6 || @ Cubs || 9–2 || Aldridge (12–6) || Blake || — || 18,000 || 82–47
|- bgcolor="ccffcc"
| 130 || September 7 || Cubs || 8–5 || Oldham (2–0) || Cooper || — || 17,000 || 83–47
|- bgcolor="ffbbbb"
| 131 || September 7 || Cubs || 8–9 (10) || Bush || Meadows (18–9) || Kaufmann || 27,000 || 83–48
|- bgcolor="ffbbbb"
| 132 || September 8 || Cubs || 2–3 || Alexander || Yde (15–8) || — || — || 83–49
|- bgcolor="ffbbbb"
| 133 || September 9 || Cubs || 7–9 (11) || Kaufmann || Morrison (16–12) || — || — || 83–50
|- bgcolor="ccffcc"
| 134 || September 10 || @ Cardinals || 9–5 || Aldridge (13–6) || Sothoron || Sheehan (1) || — || 84–50
|- bgcolor="ffbbbb"
| 135 || September 11 || @ Cardinals || 3–5 || Haines || Oldham (2–1) || — || — || 84–51
|- bgcolor="ffbbbb"
| 136 || September 12 || @ Cardinals || 0–4 || Sherdel || Meadows (18–10) || — || — || 84–52
|- bgcolor="ffbbbb"
| 137 || September 13 || @ Cardinals || 4–8 || Mails || Yde (15–9) || — || — || 84–53
|- bgcolor="ffbbbb"
| 138 || September 13 || @ Cardinals || 2–6 (5) || Reinhart || Morrison (16–13) || — || — || 84–54
|- bgcolor="ccffcc"
| 139 || September 14 || Robins || 9–4 || Aldridge (14–6) || Ehrhardt || — || 4,500 || 85–54
|- bgcolor="ccffcc"
| 140 || September 16 || Robins || 5–3 || Meadows (19–10) || Elliott || — || — || 86–54
|- bgcolor="ccffcc"
| 141 || September 16 || Robins || 6–2 || Oldham (3–1) || Osborne || — || 10,000 || 87–54
|- bgcolor="ccffcc"
| 142 || September 17 || Braves || 11–2 || Kremer (14–8) || Smith || — || — || 88–54
|- bgcolor="ccffcc"
| 143 || September 18 || Braves || 9–7 || Yde (16–9) || Graham || — || — || 89–54
|- bgcolor="ccffcc"
| 144 || September 19 || Braves || 2–1 || Aldridge (15–6) || Barnes || — || 11,000 || 90–54
|- bgcolor="ccffcc"
| 145 || September 21 || Phillies || 9–7 || Morrison (17–13) || Decatur || — || — || 91–54
|- bgcolor="ccffcc"
| 146 || September 22 || Phillies || 14–4 || Kremer (15–8) || Ring || — || — || 92–54
|- bgcolor="ccffcc"
| 147 || September 23 || Phillies || 2–1 || Yde (17–9) || Willoughby || Sheehan (2) || 2,000 || 93–54
|- bgcolor="ffbbbb"
| 148 || September 24 || Giants || 0–4 || Scott || Oldham (3–2) || — || 12,000 || 93–55
|- bgcolor="ffbbbb"
| 149 || September 26 || Giants || 3–4 || Barnes || Aldridge (15–7) || — || — || 93–56
|- bgcolor="ffbbbb"
| 150 || September 26 || Giants || 0–3 || Fitzsimmons || Morrison (17–14) || — || 18,000 || 93–57
|- bgcolor="ccffcc"
| 151 || September 27 || @ Reds || 4–3 (5) || Kremer (16–8) || Luque || — || — || 94–57
|-

|- bgcolor="ccffcc"
| 152 || October 4 || @ Reds || 4–2 || Kremer (17–8) || Goodwin || Morrison (4) || — || 95–57
|- bgcolor="ffbbbb"
| 153 || October 4 || @ Reds || 1–4 || Donohue || Culloton (0–1) || — || — || 95–58
|-

|-
| Legend:       = Win       = LossBold = Pirates team member

Opening Day lineup

Roster

Player stats

Batting

Starters by position 
Note: Pos = Position; G = Games played; AB = At bats; H = Hits; Avg. = Batting average; HR = Home runs; RBI = Runs batted in

Other batters 
Note: G = Games played; AB = At bats; H = Hits; Avg. = Batting average; HR = Home runs; RBI = Runs batted in

Pitching

Starting pitchers 
Note: G = Games pitched; IP = Innings pitched; W = Wins; L = Losses; ERA = Earned run average; SO = Strikeouts

Other pitchers 
Note: G = Games pitched; IP = Innings pitched; W = Wins; L = Losses; ERA = Earned run average; SO = Strikeouts

Relief pitchers 
Note: G = Games pitched; IP = Innings pitched; W = Wins; L = Losses; ERA = Earned run average; SO = Strikeouts

1925 World Series

Game 1 
October 7, 1925, at Forbes Field in Pittsburgh, Pennsylvania

Game 2 
October 8, 1925, at Forbes Field in Pittsburgh, Pennsylvania

Game 3 
October 10, 1925, at Griffith Stadium in Washington, D.C.

Game 4 
October 11, 1925, at Griffith Stadium in Washington, D.C.

Game 5 
October 12, 1925, at Griffith Stadium in Washington, D.C.

Game 6 
October 13, 1925, at Forbes Field in Pittsburgh, Pennsylvania

Game 7 
October 15, 1925, at Forbes Field in Pittsburgh, Pennsylvania

Awards and records

League leaders 
 Kiki Cuyler, National League leader, triples (26)

Farm system

LEAGUE CHAMPIONS: Johnstown

Notes

References 
 1925 Pittsburgh Pirates team page at Baseball Reference
 1925 Pittsburgh Pirates Page at Baseball Almanac

Pittsburgh Pirates seasons
Pittsburgh Pirates season
National League champion seasons
World Series champion seasons
Pittsburg Pir